Trichilia triacantha, the bariaco, is a species of plant in the Meliaceae family. It is endemic to Puerto Rico.  It is threatened by habitat loss. It is a federally listed endangered species of the United States.

The bariaco is a shrub or a tree reaching up to 9 meters tall. It has leaves made up of several leathery, spine-toothed leaflets and the flowers are white. The fruit is a capsule with a red aril.

The plant grows in dry forest habitat on limestone substrates, often near intermittent streams.

As of 2007 there were 10 populations of the tree containing a total of 109 individuals. 47 of these were found to be fertile. Six of the ten populations were located in the Guánica National Forest. Two of these were composed of single individuals located several kilometers from other members of the species, and so are unlikely to reproduce.

This plant has been overharvested because its wood is useful and attractive.

References

triacantha
Endemic flora of Puerto Rico
Critically endangered plants
Taxonomy articles created by Polbot